John Wilson may refer to:

Academics
 John Wilson (mathematician) (1741–1793), English mathematician and judge
 John Wilson (historian) (1799–1870), author of Our Israelitish Origin (1840), a founding text of British Israelism
 John Wilson (Scottish mathematician) (1847−1896)
 John Cook Wilson (1849–1915), English philosopher
 John Hardie Wilson (1858−1920), Scottish botanist
 J. Dover Wilson (John Dover Wilson, 1881–1969), British professor and scholar of Renaissance literature
 John A. Wilson (Egyptologist) (1899–1976), American Egyptologist
 John Wilson (industrial chemist) (1890–1976), British chemist
 John Long Wilson (1914–2001), American medical professor and university administrator
 John T. Wilson (1914–1990), president of the University of Chicago, 1975–1978
 John Silvanus Wilson, president of Morehouse College
 John Wilson (public policy expert), professor of public policy and management at Glasgow Caledonian University
 John Wilson Jr., American professor of English in Japan before and during World War II
 John Matthias Wilson (1814–?), Oxford 1 December 1881), Oxford college head
 John Stuart Wilson (born 1944), British mathematician
 John Wilson (agriculturalist) (1812–1888), British agriculturalist

Architecture and engineering
 John Wilson (English architect) (1781–1866), British Board of Ordnance clerk of works and architect in Guernsey
 John A. Wilson (topographical engineer) (1789–1833), American chief engineer on the Columbia and Philadelphia Railroad
 John William Wilson (architect) (1829–1915), architect in Rockhampton, Queensland, Australia
 John Moulder Wilson (1837–1919), Union and United States Army engineer
 John Appleton Wilson (1851–1927), American architect
 John Wilson (Scottish architect) (1877−1959), hospital architect and author
 John Tuzo Wilson (1908–1993), Canadian geophysicist
 John Armistead Wilson, Scottish-born Canadian engineer and aviation pioneer

Entertainment

Art
 John Wilson (painter, born 1774) (1774–1855), Scottish painter
 John James Wilson (1818–1875), painter, son of John Wilson
 John A. Wilson (sculptor) (1877–1954), Canadian sculptor in Nova Scotia
 John David Wilson (1919–2013), English artist, animator and producer
 John Woodrow Wilson (1922–2015), American lithographer, sculptor and art teacher

Film 
 John Wilson (filmmaker) (born 1986), American documentary filmmaker

Music
 John Wilson (composer) (1595–1674), English composer and lutenist
 John Wilson (singer) (1800–1849), Scottish tenor
 John Wilson (drummer) (born 1947), drummer from Northern Ireland
 Willie Wilson (drummer) (John Andrew Wilson, born 1947), English drummer, member of Quiver
 Back Alley John (John Carl David Wilson, 1955–2006), Canadian blues singer, songwriter and harmonica player
 John Wilson (conductor) (born 1972), British orchestral conductor

Writing
 John Wilson (playwright) (1626–1696), English playwright
 John Wilson (Scottish writer) (1785–1854), Scottish writer, pen name Christopher North
 John Mackay Wilson (1804–1835), Scottish writer
 John Marius Wilson (1805–1885), author of the Imperial Gazetteer of England and Wales (published 1870–1872)
 John S. Wilson (music critic) (1913–2002), American music critic and jazz radio host
 John Burgess Wilson (1917–1993), British author, pen name Anthony Burgess
 John Wilson (Canadian writer) (born 1951), children's writer, winner of the Norma Fleck Award
 John J. B. Wilson (born 1954), founder of the Golden Raspberry Awards, 1980
 John Morgan Wilson (born 1945), American journalist and author

Law
 John G. Wilson (1842–1892), British patent agent
 John Wilson, Lord Ashmore (1857–1932), Scottish lawyer, parliamentary candidate, sheriff principal and judge
 John H. Wilson (judge), American judge from New York, author of the 2006 children's book Hot House Flowers

Military
 John Wilson (British Army officer, died 1819) (c. 1765–1819), British general, Lieutenant-Governor of Lower Canada in 1816
 Sir John Wilson (British Army officer, died 1856) (1780–1856), British general, acting Governor of British Ceylon in 1811–12 and 1831
 John Williams Wilson (1798–1857), English sailor
 John Wilson (Royal Navy officer) (1834–1885), British admiral
 John Moulder Wilson (1837–1919), U.S. Army general and Medal of Honor recipient
 John Wilson (Medal of Honor, born 1839), recipient of the Medal of Honor in the American Civil War
 John A. Wilson (Medal of Honor) (1833–1904), American Civil War recipient of the Medal of Honor
 John Wilson (Swedish sailor) (1851–1899), Swedish naval officer
 Jock Wilson (British Army soldier) (John Nicholson Wilson, 1903–2008), Scottish soldier and centenarian
 John Wilson (Garda) (born 1962/63), Irish Garda officer and whistleblower

Politics

Canada
 John Wilson (Ontario politician, born 1807) (1807–1869), lawyer, judge and politician in Ontario, Canada
 John Henry Wilson (Canadian politician) (1834–1912), physician, professor and politician in Ontario, Canada
 John Wilson (British Columbia politician) (born 1944), member of the Legislative Assembly of British Columbia, Canada
 John Wilson (New Brunswick politician) (1861–1935), member of the Legislative Assembly of New Brunswick

United Kingdom
 John Wilson (Castle Rising MP), member of parliament in 1621
 John Wilson (Mid Durham MP) (1837–1915), miner, trade unionist and Liberal-Labour politician
 John William Wilson (1858–1932), Liberal member of parliament for Worcestershire North, 1895–1918, and Stourbridge, 1918–1922
 John Charles Wilson (1892–1968), Northern Irish politician, Ulster Unionist member of parliament for Iveagh, 1933–1938
 John Wilson (London politician) (born 1941), leader of Greater London Council in 1984
 John Wilson, 2nd Baron Moran (1924–2014), British diplomat

Scotland
 John Wilson (Govan MP) (1828–1905), Liberal member of parliament for Govan, 1889–1900
 John Wilson (Edinburgh MP) (1830–?), Independent Liberal member of parliament for Edinburgh Central, 1885–1886
 John Wilson (Glasgow St Rollox MP) (1837–1928), member of parliament for Glasgow St Rollox, 1900–1906
 Sir John Wilson, 1st Baronet (1844–1918), Unionist member of parliament for Falkirk Burghs
 John Gray Wilson (1915–1968), Scottish advocate, sheriff, writer and Liberal Party politician
 John Wilson (trade unionist, born 1920) (1920–1996), trade union general secretary
 John Wilson (Scottish Green politician) (born 1956), member of the Scottish Parliament

United States
 John Wilson (South Carolina politician, born 1773) (1773–1828), member of the U.S. House of Representatives
 John Wilson (Massachusetts politician) (1777–1848), member of the U.S. House of Representatives, 1813
 John Lyde Wilson (1784–1849), governor of South Carolina, 1822–1824
 John Wilson (bureaucrat) (1807–1876), official in the Department of the Treasury and Department of the Interior
 John Thomas Wilson (1811–1891), member of the U.S. House of Representatives from Ohio
 John Frank Wilson (1846–1911), member of the U.S. House of Representatives from Arizona Territory
 John Henry Wilson (Kentucky politician) (1846–1923), lawyer and member of the U.S. House of Representatives, 1889–1893
 John L. Wilson (1850–1912), U.S. Senator from Washington State
 John Haden Wilson (1867–1946), member of the U.S. House of Representatives from Pennsylvania
 John H. Wilson (Hawaii politician) (1871–1956), mayor of Honolulu, Hawaii
 John H. Wilson (Arizona politician), member of the Arizona House of Representatives, 1949–1950
 John J. Wilson (1926–2015), member of the New Jersey General Assembly
 John A. Wilson (politician) (1943–1993), member of the Council of the District of Columbia
 John Wilson (Kansas politician) (born 1983), member of the Kansas House of Representatives

Other countries
 John Bowie Wilson (1820–1883), member of the New South Wales Legislative Assembly
 John Cracroft Wilson (1808–1881), British civil servant in India, farmer and politician in New Zealand
 John Nathaniel Wilson (died 1897), member of the New Zealand Legislative Council
 John Wilson (Irish politician) (1923–2007), Irish politician
 John N. Wilson, Indian politician

Religion
 John Wilson (Dean of Ripon) (1586–1635), Anglican priest and Dean of Ripon Minster, 1624–1634
 John Wilson (Puritan minister) (1591–1667), Puritan minister of the Boston Church in Massachusetts
 John Wilson (Scottish missionary) (1804–1875), Scottish missionary, educationalist, a founding father of Bombay
 John Marius Wilson (1805–1885), Scottish clergyman and writer
 John Leighton Wilson (1809–1885), American missionary to West Africa
 John Wilson (Caddo) (1840–1901), leader in the Native American Church movement of the late 19th century
 John Wilson (Scottish priest) (1849–1926), Provost of St Mary's Cathedral, Edinburgh
 John Wilson (Royal Navy chaplain) (1890–1949), Anglican priest and Chaplain of the Fleet, 1943–1948
 John Leonard Wilson (1897–1970), Anglican bishop of Singapore
 John Wilson (bishop) (born 1968), Roman Catholic archbishop of Southwark, England
 John Alexander Wilson (missionary) (1809–1887), Anglican missionary

Sports

Baseball
 John Wilson (1910s pitcher) (1890–1954), Washington Senators
 John Wilson (1920s pitcher) (1903–1980), Boston Red Sox

Cricket
 John Wilson (Yorkshire cricketer) (1857–1931), English cricketer
 John Wilson (Tasmania cricketer) (1868–1906), Australian cricketer
 John Wilson (New South Wales cricketer) (born 1947), Australian cricketer
 John Wilson (New Zealand cricketer) (born 1957), New Zealand cricketer

Football
 John Wilson (footballer, born 1889) (1889–1914), Scottish footballer
 John Wilson (footballer, born 1914) (1914–1988), English footballer, 1930s inside right for Port Vale
 John "Weenie" Wilson (fl. 1933–1968), American football player and multi-sport coach
 John Wilson (footballer, born 1934), English footballer, 1950s full back for Norwich and Chesterfield
 John Wilson (Australian footballer) (born 1940), Australian rules footballer for Richmond
 John Wilson (footballer, born 1952), English footballer, 1970s midfielder for Darlington
 John Wilson (soccer) (born 1977), American soccer player
 John Parker Wilson (born 1985), American football player

Rugby
 John Skinner Wilson (rugby union) (1884–1916), Trinidad-born rugby player who represented Scotland
 John Howard Wilson (1930–2015), Scottish rugby union player
 John Wilson (New Zealand rugby league) (fl. 1972–1977), New Zealand rugby league international
 John Wilson (rugby league, born 1978), Australian rugby league footballer

Other sports
 John Wilson (cyclist) (1876–1957), British Olympic road racing cyclist and rugby league administrator
 John Wilson (sport shooter) (1879–1940), Dutch sport shooter
 John Wilson (angler) (1943–2018), British angler
 John Wilson (speedway rider) (born 1941), motorcycle speedway rider
 Jocky Wilson (John Thomas Wilson, 1950–2012), Scottish darts player
 John Wilson (golfer) (born 1959), American professional golfer
 John Wilson (basketball) (born 1987), Filipino basketball player
 John Wilson (athlete) (born 1948), English sprinter

Other
 John Wilson, an alias of John Smith (housebreaker) (c. 1661–after 1727), English housebreaker
 John Macaulay Wilson (fl. 1794–1827), African king and doctor
 John W. Wilson (1815–1883), Belgian art collector and businessman
 John West Wilson (1816–1889), British/Swedish businessman and arts patron
 John Wilson (philanthropist) (1826–1900), Irish-born pioneer of the American West
 John Wilson (businessman) (1829–1909), New Zealand farmer, soldier, judge
 J. S. Wilson (John Skinner Wilson, 1888–1969), Scottish scouting organizer
 Sir John Wilson, 2nd Baronet (1898–1975), Keeper of the Royal Philatelic Collection
 John C. Wilson (1899–1961), Broadway producer and director
 Sir John Wilson (civil servant) (1915–1993), British civil servant
 John Wilson (blind activist) (1919–1999), founder of International Agency for the Prevention of Blindness
 Jock Wilson (police officer) (John Spark Wilson, 1922–1993), British police officer
 John S. Wilson (economist) (born 1956), American economist at the World Bank
 John Wilson (broadcaster) (born 1965), British journalist and broadcaster

Other uses
 John Wilson (ice skating company), a British company
 John Wilson Orchestra, formed by British conductor John Wilson in 1994
 John W. Wilson, a GWR 3031 Class locomotive on the Great Western Railway in 1891–1915, renamed Walter Robinson in 1901

See also
 John S. Wilson (disambiguation)
 John Skinner Wilson (disambiguation)
 Johnny Wilson (disambiguation)
 Jonathan Wilson (disambiguation)
 Jack Wilson (disambiguation)
 Jock Wilson (disambiguation)
 John Waterloo Wilson (disambiguation)